Greiz is a town in the state of Thuringia, Germany, and is the capital of the district of Greiz.

Greiz has a large park in its center (Fürstlich Greizer Park) which is classified as an English garden. Thomasstraße, Burgstraße, Marktstraße, Waldstraße, and Leonhardtstraße with their Jugendstil houses are well known examples of that architectural style. Prof.-Dr.-Friedrich-Schneider-Straße 4 is one of the earliest examples of Art Deco architecture (built in 1911).

History
As with other nearby settlements, the place name (originally Grouts) is of Slavic origin and means gord. The first documented mention of the settlement dates from 1209. The prime location of Greiz on the confluence of the White Elster river and its tributary Göltzsch helped to make it a fast-growing town. From the 12th century it was governed by advocati, but in 1236 it came into the possession of Gera. It was recognized as a town in the 13th century. Later the House of Reuss, a ruling German dynasty whose male members were all named Heinrich, built two castles in Greiz: the "Oberes Schloss" (Upper Castle) and the "Unteres Schloss" (Lower Castle). Both were built by famous architects and are still considered unique. Greiz became the capital of the Principality of Reuss-Greiz until 1918.

The town was wholly destroyed by fire in 1494, and almost totally in 1802.

Between 1934 and 1943 809 people were forcibly sterilized by Nazis in the district hospital in Wichmannstraße. The local old folk's home and the care home submitted 122 sick people to the euthanasia program Aktion T4.

During World War II hundreds of prisoners of war as well as men and women from countries occupied by Nazi Germany worked as forced laborers in Sorgwald near Thalbach, a village about 2 km south-east of Greiz and in other enterprises. At least 102 of them died. There is a memorial for them in the Old Cemetery.

There is also a monument to the officer Kurt von Westernhagen, who refused orders in April 1945 to blow up the bridge and defend the town, for which he was shot by the Gestapo.

During World War II, Greiz did not suffer much damage, although 3 of the 5 bridges in town were destroyed. In 1941, Ulf Merbold , who became in 1983 the first astronaut from West Germany was born in 1943.

Greiz has a population of about 20,400 people. The former municipality Neumühle/Elster was merged into Greiz in December 2019.

Economy
In addition to a chemical works and a disused paper factory there are mechanical engineering operations, plastics manufacturing businesses, wood machining enterprises, medical technology, suppliers to the automobile industry, printing houses and breweries. In recent years various high tech businesses (sensor technology, climate simulators, micro-chip production) and environmental technology companies developed.

Neighbouring towns and districts 
The following are the districts adjacent to Greiz:
 In the Greiz district: Zeulenroda-Triebes, Langenwetzendorf, Mohlsdorf-Teichwolframsdorf, Berga/Elster
 In the Vogtlandkreis district (Saxony): Reichenbach im Vogtland, Netzschkau, Elsterberg, Pöhl, Plauen, Rosenbach/Vogtl.
Adjacent towns include: 
 Elsterberg
 Reichenbach im Vogtland
 Hohenleuben
 Werdau

Transport
Greiz station is on the Gera Süd–Weischlitz railway.

Demographics
The current population is about 20,400. Like many towns in the former East Germany, Greiz has suffered from population decline in recent years.

References

External links
 
 Town of Greiz

 
Greiz (district)
Principality of Reuss-Greiz